Riot control measures are used by law enforcement, military, paramilitary or security forces to control, disperse, and arrest people who are involved in a riot, unlawful demonstration or unlawful protest.

If a riot is spontaneous and irrational, actions which cause people to stop and think for a moment (e.g. loud noises or issuing instructions in a calm tone) can be enough to stop it. However, these methods usually fail when there is severe anger with a legitimate cause, or the riot was planned or organized. Riot control personnel have long used less lethal weapons such as batons and whips to disperse crowds and detain rioters. Since the 1980s, riot control officers have also used tear gas, pepper spray, rubber bullets, stun grenades, and electric tasers. In some cases, riot squads may also use Long Range Acoustic Devices, water cannons, armoured fighting vehicles, aerial surveillance, police dogs or mounted police on horses. Persons performing riot control typically wear protective equipment such as riot helmets, face visors, body armor (vests, neck protectors, knee pads, etc.), gas masks and riot shields.

There have been cases where lethal weapons are used to violently suppress a protest or riot, as in the Boston Massacre, Haymarket Massacre, Banana Massacre, Hungarian Revolution of 1956, Kent State Shootings, Soweto Uprising, Sharpeville massacre, Mendiola Massacre, Bloody Sunday (1905), Ponce massacre, Bloody Sunday (1972), 1989 Tiananmen Square protests, 2017 Venezuelan protests, 2018–2019 Gaza border protests, Citizenship Amendment Act protests, 2022 Sri Lankan protests,2022 Kazakh unrest and Mahsa Amini protests.

History

Maintaining order during demonstrations and quenching riots has always been a challenge for governments and administrations. Until early in the 20th century, no dedicated force really existed in most countries and the traditional response when the regular police force proved inadequate was to call upon the army, often with disastrous results: either fraternization or use of excessive violence.

The terminology arguably first arises in the Keystone Cops short "A Hash House Fraud" in 1915.

In France, for example, several revolts were fueled by poor handling by the military. The National Gendarmerie created specialized "mobile" gendarmerie forces several times during the 19th century in times of trouble but these units were disbanded soon after the end of the troubles they had been tasked to handle and there was no permanent organization in place until it was finally decided in 1921 to create "Mobile Gendarmerie platoons" within the Departmental Gendarmerie. These platoons, either horse mounted or on foot were composed of 40 gendarmes each (60 in the Paris Region). In 1926, the platoons formed the "Garde Républicaine mobile" (mobile republican guard or GRM), which became a distinct branch of the Gendarmerie in 1927, the platoons becoming part of companies and legions. By 1940, the GRM was a force 21,000 strong, composed of 14 Légions, 54 company groups and 167 companies.

Long the only large force specialized in maintaining or restoring law and order in France during demonstrations or riots, the GRM progressively developed the doctrine and skills needed in that role: exercise restraint, avoid confrontation as long as possible, always leave an "exit door" for the crowd, etc. In 1940, after the fall of France, the German authorities had the GRM disbanded but it was reinstated in 1944 and renamed Mobile Gendarmerie in 1954.

The first squad trained in modern techniques of riot control in Asia was formed in 1925 in colonial Shanghai as a response to the mismanaged riot of the May Thirtieth Movement.

New policing methods, including combat pistol shooting, hand to hand combat skills, and knife fight training, were pioneered by British Assistant Commissioner William E. Fairbairn and officer Eric Anthony Sykes of the Shanghai Municipal Police as a response to a staggering rise in armed crime in the Shanghai had become one of the world's most dangerous cities due to a breakdown in law and order in the country and the growth of organised crime and the opium trade.

Under Fairbairn, the SMP developed a myriad of riot control measures. These riot control techniques led to the introduction of Shanghai's "Reserve Unit", used to forcibly disband riots and respond to high-level crimes such as kidnappings and armed robberies. The skills developed in Shanghai have been adopted and adapted by both international police forces and clandestine warfare units. Fairbairn was again the central figure, not only leading the Reserve Unit, but teaching his methods around the world, including in the United States, and colonial Cyprus and the Straits Settlements.

Equipment

For protection, officers that are trained in police anti-riot schools performing riot control will often wear protective helmets and carry riot shields. These are designed to protect the wearer from those dangers that come from direct melee and hurled objects such as bottles and bricks. The gear frequently worn by riot control officers protects the entire body with no vulnerable spots to exploit. For example, the helmets worn by riot control officers have an additional outward-extending part that protects the back of the neck from assault. To provide even greater protection, the protective equipment often provides ballistic protection. If tear gas or other riot control agents are to be used, gas masks may also be worn.

One of many additional concerns is to prevent people in the crowd from snatching officers' side arms, which may be stolen or even used against the police. In a very heavy crowd, the officer may not be able to see who is responsible for snatching a weapon, and may not even notice that it has happened. For this reason, riot police may have holsters with positive locking mechanisms or other extra means of retention, if their agencies can afford such tools. However, this can be a trade-off that increases the amount of time needed to draw the sidearm in an emergency. Alternately, riot police may not carry sidearms at all.

The initial choice of tactics determines the type of offensive equipment used. The base choice is between lethal (e.g. 12 gauge shotgun) and less-than-lethal weaponry (e.g. tear gas, pepper spray, plastic bullets, tasers, batons, and other incapacitants). The decision is based on the perceived level of threat and the existing laws; in many countries it is illegal to use lethal force to control riots in all but the most extreme circumstances.

Vehicle-mounted water cannons may serve to augment personal weapons. Some water cannons let police add dye to mark rioters or tear gas to help disperse the crowds.

In major unrest, police in armoured vehicles may be sent in following an initial subduing with firepower. Occasionally, police dogs, fire hoses, or mounted police are deployed.

Riot control agent (RCA) 

Riot control agents (sometimes called RCAs) are non-lethal lachrymatory agents used for riot control. Most commonly used riot control agents are pepper spray and various kinds of tear gas. These chemicals disperse a crowd that could be protesting or rioting, or to clear a building. They can rapidly produce sensory irritation or disabling physical effects which usually disappear within 15 minutes (for tear gas) and up to 2 hours (for pepper spray) following termination of exposure. They can also be used for chemical warfare defense training, although their use in warfare itself is a violation of Article I.5 of the Chemical Weapons Convention. Article II.9 of the CWC specifically authorizes their use for domestic law enforcement.

Pepper spray

The active ingredient in pepper-spray is capsaicin, which is a chemical derived from the fruit of plants in the Capsicum genus, including chilies. Desmethyldihydrocapsaicin, a synthetic analogue of capsaicin also known as pelargonic acid vanillylamide or PAVA, is used in another version of pepper spray known as PAVA spray and used in the United Kingdom. Another synthetic counterpart of pepper spray, pelargonic acid morpholide, was developed and is widely used in Russia. Its effectiveness compared to natural pepper spray is uncertain and it reportedly has caused some injuries. When undesirables threaten an area, such as a riot after a soccer game, riot police are called in to subdue them. In these situations, the police may use pepper spray, or water cannons to neutralize the threat.

Pepper spray typically comes in canisters, which are often small enough to be carried or concealed in a pocket or purse. Pepper spray can also be bought concealed in items such as rings. There are also pepper spray projectiles available, which can be fired from a paintball gun. Having been used for years against demonstrators, it is increasingly being used by police in routine interventions.

Tear gas

Tear gas is a non-specific term for any chemical that is used to temporarily incapacitate through irritation of eyes and/or respiratory system. It is used as a hand-held spray or can be fired in canisters that heat up spewing out an aerosol cloud at a steady rate.

Whilst the use of tear gas in warfare is prohibited by various international treaties that most states have signed, however police and private self-defense use is not banned in an international manner.

Popular tear gases include the eye irritants ortho-chlorobenzylidene-malononitrile (CS gas), chloroacetophenone (CN gas), and dibenz (b,f)-1,4-oxazepine (CR gas). Among a long list of substances, these three have become of greater importance than the others because of their effectiveness and low risks when used. Today, CS has largely replaced CN as the most widely used tear gas internationally.

Decontamination

At room temperature, tear gases are white solids. They are stable when heated and have low vapor pressure. Consequently, they are usually dispersed as aerosols. All of them have low solubility in water but can be dissolved in several organic solvents. Hydrolysis of CN is very slow in a water solution, especially if alkali is added. CS is rapidly hydrolyzed in water solution (half-life at pH 7 is about 15 min. at room temperature) and extremely rapid when alkali is added (half-life at pH 9 is about 1 min.). CR is hydrolyzed only to a negligible extent in water solution.

CN and CR are, thus, difficult to decompose under practical conditions, whereas CS can easily be inactivated by means of a water solution. Skin is suitably decontaminated of CS and CN gas by thorough washing with soap and water. CS is then decomposed, whereas CN is only removed via soap and water. The effects of CR gas are greatly increased by water, causing any attempt to DECON CR via soap and water to increase the severity and duration of the effects. When decontamination of CR is attempted with soap and water the effects of CR can last up to 48 hours

Decontamination of material after contamination with CR gas is not possible for up to 45 days. CS can be decontaminated l with a 5–10 percent soda solution or 2 percent alkaline solution. If this type of decontamination cannot be accomplished (e.g., contaminated rooms and furniture), then the only other means is by intensive air exchange—preferably with hot air. Exposed streets and sidewalks will have toxic and irritating CS powder that will be stirred into the air by traffic and pedestrians long after the cloud has dissipated, and should be washed away with water. In contrast to human beings, domesticated animals generally have lower sensitivity to tear gases. Dogs and horses can therefore be used by police for riot control even when tear gas is used.

Dispensing large quantities
Backpack dispensers for riot control agents, when the intent is to use a larger quantity than possible with grenades, are one type of device used by organizations that might, for example, need to cover a prison yard. Dispensers are also made for attachment to helicopters; see CBU-19.

Tactics

The front-line officers in a riot control are often fully armored and carry weapons such as batons, designed to be in direct contact with the crowd. These officers subdue rioters and subsequently allow the less heavily armoured, more mobile officers to make arrests where it is deemed necessary. In face of a greater threat, the riot police will be backed up with other officers equipped with riot guns to fire tear gas, rubber bullets, plastic bullets or "beanbag" rounds.

As a less aggressive step, mounted police may first be sent into the crowd. The might and height offered by the horse are combined with its training, allowing an officer to more safely infiltrate a crowd.  Usually, when front-facing a riot, officers slowly walk in a line parallel to the riot's front, extending to both its ends, as they noisily and simultaneously march and beat their shields with their batons, to cause fear and psychological effects on the crowd.

Since the advent of artillery, straight roads have been of notable importance in city defense and control. Upon coming to power, Napoleon III built great avenues, referred to as anti-riot streets, into the troublesome quarters of Paris. The wide straight roads also allowed for cavalry charges to subdue rioters.

In the United Kingdom, usually when large demonstrations take place that are deemed unstable, the territorial police force responsible for the demonstration in that area will usually deploy Police Support Unit personnel who are trained in riot tactics, along with normal divisional officers. If the demonstration turns violent, police will seal roads and other exits to contain protesters in a single area (known as kettling) to prevent widespread damage and wait until the protesters tire. These tactics were seen during the 2009 G-20 London summit protests and the 2010 student protests in London. Tear gas and other more offensive tactics are used as a last resort. Throughout police will be videoing or photographing protesters for future arrests, "snatch squad" tactics might also be used where several police officers, usually in protective riot gear, rush forwards, occasionally in flying wedge formation to break through the front of a crowd, with the objective of snatching one or more individuals from a riot that are attempting to control the demonstration at which they are present; the target may be a leader or a speaker, or someone who seems to be leading the crowd. This tactic was used in the 2011 England Riots, most notably by Greater Manchester Police who deployed this tactic in Manchester city centre on 9 August 2011.

A more straightforward tactic police may use is a baton charge which involves police officers charging at a crowd of people with batons and in some cases, riot shields. They run at the crowd hitting people with their batons, and in some situations use riot shields to push them away. Baton charging is designed to cause the maximum amount of pain, in the hope that they would be compelled to move away from the scene, dispersing the crowd.

Research

Research into weapons that are more effective for riot control continues. Netguns are non-lethal weapons designed to fire a net which entangles the target. Netguns have a long history of being used to capture wildlife, without injury, for research purposes. A netgun is currently in development for non-lethal riot control. Pepper-spray projectile launchers are projectile weapons that launch a fragile ball which breaks upon impact and releases an irritant powder called PAVA (capsaicin II) pepper.  The launchers are often slightly modified .68 caliber paintball guns.

Stink bombs are devices designed to create an extremely unpleasant smell for riot control and area denial purposes. Stink bombs are believed to be less dangerous than other riot control chemicals, since they are effective at low concentrations. Sticky foam weapons are being tested, which cover and immobilize rioters with a gooey foam.

Low frequency sound cannons are weapons of various types that use sound to injure or incapacitate subjects using a focused beam of sound or infrasound. Active denial systems (ADS) are a non-lethal, directed-energy weapon developed by the U.S. military. The ADS directs electromagnetic radiation, specifically, high-frequency microwave radiation, at a frequency of 95 GHz, which causes the water in the upper epidermis to boil, stimulating a "burning" sensation in the nerve endings and generating intense pain. Dazzler lasers are directed-energy weapons that use intense light to cause temporary blindness or disorientation of rioters.

See also
Demoralization (warfare)
Free speech zone
Personal armor
Blunt trauma personal protective equipment
Baton charge
Crowd control
Crowd manipulation
Stampede
Non-military armored vehicle
Kettling
Snatch squad

Riot control units
Garda Public Order Unit (Ireland)
Units for the Reinstatement of Order (Greece)
Mobile Brigade Corps (Indonesia)
Compagnies Républicaines de Sécurité (France)
Mobile Gendarmerie (France)
Police Tactical Unit (Hong Kong)
Special Tactical Squad (Hong Kong)
Territorial Support Group (London in England)
Carabinieri Mobile Units Division (Italy)
Mobile Unit (Italy)
 (Spain)

Weapons used in riot control

Non-lethal weapon
CS gas
Long Range Acoustic Device
Plastic bullets
Pepper spray
Rubber bullet
Water cannon
Pellet guns (pellet shotguns)
 Use of bayonets for crowd control

Notes

References

External links